Kanyaka is a 1978 Indian Malayalam-language film, directed by J. Sasikumar. The film stars Madhu, Jayan, Jayabharathi and KPAC Lalitha. The film has musical score by M. K. Arjunan.

Cast
Madhu as Sreekumar
Jayan as Ayappan
Sheela as Geetha
Jayabharathi as Malathi
KPAC Lalitha as Nandini
Maniyampillai Raju 
Thikkurissy Sukumaran Nair 
Sankaradi 
T. R. Omana as Bhavaniyamma
Bahadoor as Aliyar
Janardanan as Raghavan
Nellikode Bhaskaran as Raman Nair
Vanjiyoor Radha as Bivathu
Sukumari as Madhaviyamma
Paul Vengola as Pachu Pilla
Thodupuzha Radhakrishnan as Thommi

Soundtrack
The music was composed by M. K. Arjunan and the lyrics were written by Pappanamkodu Lakshmanan.

References

External links
 

1978 films
1970s Malayalam-language films
Films directed by J. Sasikumar